Notholaena californica is a species of fern known by the common name California cloak fern. It is native to southern California and Arizona in the United States, and in adjacent north-western Mexico, where it grows in dry and rocky conditions, often in desert and chaparral habitats.

Description
The leaves are divided into often asymmetrical leaflets which are subdivided into lobed segments, the leaf measuring 3 to 20 centimeters in total length, not counting the long, brown petiole. It is hairless and lacks scales. The leaf is covered in grainy exudate known as farina. As with many other Cheilanthoid ferns, the fronds can curl up when dry and expand again with moisture.

Chemotypes
The fern comes in two chemotypes which can be distinguished by the color of the farina, white or yellow, and the two are rarely found growing together. The two chemotypes are sometimes treated as subspecies.

Subspecies
Notholaena californica ssp. californica' '— Transverse Ranges, Peninsular RangesNotholaena californica ssp. leucophylla'' — endemic to northwest San Gabriel Mountains, east San Jacinto Mountain.

References

External links
Jepson Manual Treatment — Notholaena californica
USDA Plants Profile: Notholaena californica
Notholaena californica — U.C. Photo gallery

californica
Ferns of California
Ferns of Mexico
Ferns of the United States
Flora of Arizona
Flora of Northwestern Mexico
Flora of the California desert regions
Flora of the Sonoran Deserts
Natural history of the California chaparral and woodlands
Natural history of the Colorado Desert
Natural history of the Peninsular Ranges
Natural history of the Transverse Ranges
Plants described in 1883
Ferns of the Americas